Mitromorpha braziliensis is a species of sea snail, a marine gastropod mollusk in the family Mitromorphidae.

Description

Distribution
This marine species occurs off Brazil

References

 Mifsud, C. (2009) Two new species of Mitromorpha Carpenter 1865 from the western Atlantic (Conoidea: Mitromorphinae). Journal of Conchology, 40, 99–101

External links
 

braziliensis
Gastropods described in 2009